Kahur may refer to:
 Kahur, Hormozgan
 Kahur, Sarduiyeh, Kerman Province